In Greek mythology, Nephalion (Ancient Greek:  Νηφαλίωνα) was one of the four sons of Minos, who lived on the Greek island of Paros. Nephalion and his brothers Eurymedon, Khryses, and Philolaus rebelled against Herakles and murdered two sailors from one of his vessels that had washed up ashore on the rocks of Paros.

References 
Sources
 Apollodorus, The Library with an English Translation by Sir James George Frazer, F.B.A., F.R.S. in 2 Volumes, Cambridge, MA, Harvard University Press; London, William Heinemann Ltd. 1921. ISBN 0-674-99135-4. Online version at the Perseus Digital Library. Greek text available from the same website.
Citations

Characters in Greek mythology